Cherko la() is a mountain pass in Gar, Ngari, Tibet, and forms the watershed between Langqen_Zangbo and Gar Tsangpo which is a headwater of Sengge_Zangbo.

References

Mountain passes of Tibet
Mountain passes of China
Transhimalayas
Tibetan Plateau
Ngari Prefecture